KEAL (106.5 FM) is a radio station broadcasting a Spanish radio format. Licensed to Taft, California, United States. The station is currently owned by Lazer Licenses, LLC.

References

External links

EAL
Radio stations established in 1977